Obiltoxaximab, sold under the brand name Anthim among others, is a monoclonal antibody medication designed for the treatment of exposure to Bacillus anthracis spores (etiologic agent of anthrax).

The medication was developed by Elusys Therapeutics, Inc.

Medical uses 
Obiltoxaximab is indicated in combination with appropriate antibacterial drugs in all age groups for treatment of inhalational anthrax due to Bacillus anthracis. It is also indicated in all age groups for post-exposure prophylaxis of inhalational anthrax when alternative therapies are not appropriate or are not available.

Society and culture

Legal status 
In March 2016, obiltoxaximab was approved by the U.S. Food and Drug Administration (FDA) for the treatment and prophylaxis of inhalational anthrax.

On 17 September 2020, the Committee for Medicinal Products for Human Use (CHMP) of the European Medicines Agency (EMA) adopted a positive opinion, recommending the granting of a marketing authorization under exceptional circumstances for obiltoxaximab, intended for the treatment or post-exposure prophylaxis of inhalational anthrax. The applicant for this medicinal product is SFL Pharmaceuticals Deutschland GmbH. It was approved for medical use in the European Union in November 2020.

References

External links 
 

Monoclonal antibodies
Orphan drugs